Laurent Georges Grimmonprez known as Flokke Grimmonprez (14 December 1902 in Gentbrugge, Ghent, Belgium – 22 May 1984) was a Belgian footballer. He played as a striker and inside-right for Royal Racing Club de Gand during the interwar period.

Grimmonprez played 10 games and scored one goal for the Diables Rouges. He was picked for the Olympic Games in 1924 in France and played in the World Cup in 1934 in Italy.

Honours 
 International from 1924 to 1934 (10 caps and 1 goal)
 Picked for the Olympic Games in 1924 (did not play)
 Participation in the 1934 World Cup (played 1 match)
 Top scorer in the Belgian First Division in 1926 (28 goals)
 Top scorer in the Belgian Second Division in 1931 (? goals)

References 

1902 births
1984 deaths
Belgian footballers
Belgium international footballers
1934 FIFA World Cup players
Footballers from Ghent
Association football midfielders
Association football forwards
K.R.C. Gent players